Kennalu  is a village in the southern state of Karnataka, India. It is located in the Pandavapura taluk of Mandya district in Karnataka. 400 years old Shiva temple is an attraction in the village.  This temple is renovated by Mr. Veerendra Hegde of Dharmasthala.

Demographics
As of 2001 India census, Kennalu had a population of 7470 with 3795 males and 3675 females.

See also
 Mandya
 Districts of Karnataka

References

External links
 http://Mandya.nic.in/

Villages in Mandya district